Herb Christopher may refer to:
Actaea (plant), a genus of flowering plants also known as Herb Christopher
Herb Christopher (American football) (born 1954), American football player